The following is an alphabetical list of topics related to the Republic of Colombia.

0–9

.co – Internet country code top-level domain for Colombia

A
Adjacent countries:

Americas
South America
Islands of Chile
North Atlantic Ocean
Mar Caribe (Caribbean Sea)
North Pacific Ocean
Atlas of Colombia

B
Bogotá, Distrito Capital – Capital of Colombia

C
Capital of Colombia:  Bogotá, Distrito Capital
Caribbean
Caribbean Community (CARICOM)
Caribbean Sea
Categories:
:Category:Colombia
:Category:Buildings and structures in Colombia
:Category:Colombia stubs
:Category:Colombian culture
:Category:Colombian people
:Category:Colombia-related lists
:Category:Communications in Colombia
:Category:Economy of Colombia
:Category:Education in Colombia

:Category:Environment of Colombia
:Category:Geography of Colombia
:Category:Government of Colombia
:Category:Health in Colombia
:Category:History of Colombia
:Category:Images of Colombia
:Category:Law of Colombia
:Category:Military of Colombia
:Category:Politics of Colombia
:Category:Science and technology in Colombia
:Category:Society of Colombia
:Category:Sport in Colombia
:Category:Transportation in Colombia
commons:Category:Colombia
Coat of arms of Colombia
Colombia
Communications in Colombia

D
Demographics of Colombia

E
Economy of Colombia
Equator

F

Flag of Colombia
Foreign relations of Colombia

G
Geography of Colombia

H
"Himno Nacional de la República de Colombia"
History of Colombia

I
Indigenous peoples of Colombia
International Organization for Standardization (ISO)
ISO 3166-1 alpha-2 country code for Colombia: CO
ISO 3166-1 alpha-3 country code for Colombia: COL
ISO 3166-2:CO region codes for Colombia
Islands of Colombia:
Bajo Nuevo Bank
Cayos de Albuquerque
Cayos de Este Sudeste
Providencia Island
Quita Sueňo Bank
Roncador Bank
San Andrés Island
Santa Catalina Island, Colombia
Serrana Bank
Serranilla Bank

L
Latin America
Lists related to Colombia:
Diplomatic missions of Colombia
List of Colombians
List of airports in Colombia
List of birds of Colombia
List of cities in Colombia
List of Colombia-related topics
List of diplomatic missions in Colombia
List of entities in the executive branch of Colombia
List of films depicting Colombia
List of football stadiums in Colombia
List of islands of Colombia
List of massacres in Colombia
List of municipalities in Antioquia
List of municipalities in Boyacá
List of newspapers in Colombia
List of people called by the Colombian Supreme court in the parapolitics scandal
List of political parties in Colombia
List of presidents of Colombia
List of reportedly haunted locations in Colombia
List of universities in Colombia
List of wars involving Colombia
Topic outline of Colombia

M
 Military of Colombia
 Muisca Confederation
 Muisca people

N
National Anthem of Colombia
North Pacific Ocean
Northern Hemisphere and Southern Hemisphere

O
Ombudsman's Office of Colombia

P
Pacific Ocean
Pico Cristóbal Colón – highest point in Colombia and the fifth most prominent summit on Earth
Politics of Colombia

R
Republic of Colombia (República de Colombia)
Revenue stamps of Colombia

S
Scouting in Colombia
South America
Southern Hemisphere and Northern Hemisphere
Spanish colonization of the Americas
Spanish conquest of the Chibchan Nations
Spanish language

T
Topic outline of Colombia
Transport in Colombia
Tropics

U
United Nations founding member state 1945
UNASUR

W
Water supply and sanitation in Colombia
Western Hemisphere

Wikipedia:WikiProject Topic outline/Drafts/Topic outline of Colombia

See also

List of international rankings
Lists of country-related topics
Topic outline of Colombia
Topic outline of geography
Topic outline of South America
United Nations

References

External links

 
Colombia